The Vekoma Junior Coaster is a model of steel roller coaster built by Vekoma. It is commonly referred to as a “roller skater” due to the roller skate shaped cars found on some of the installations, and is credited with greatly influencing the concept of the junior roller coaster, which is found at many theme parks today.

Design and operation

Most Vekoma Junior Coasters consist of a single train made up of several cars, each with a single row of riders. Some, such as Flight of the Hippogriff at Islands of Adventure in Orlando, operate with two trains. There are three basic models (85 meters, 207 meters, and 335 meters), although Vekoma also provides custom models. Instead of the chain lift found on most roller coasters, Vekoma Junior Coasters usually use friction wheels to carry the train up the lift hill.

Installations

See also
 Vekoma Family Boomerang
 Vekoma Suspended Family Coaster

External links
 Official website
 Listing of all Vekoma Junior Coaster at the Roller Coaster Database

Roller coasters manufactured by Vekoma
Mass-produced roller coasters
Junior Coaster
Junior roller coasters